The 1990 Asian Men's Softball Championship was an international softball tournament which featured five nations which was held in Manila, Philippines.

Participants

References

Asian Men's Softball Championship
International softball competitions hosted by the Philippines
1990 in Philippine sport